By the end of June, 2018, there had been more than 560 wildfires in British Columbia.

The Comstock Lake fire, discovered  on June 21, was caused by lightning. At one point over 200 personnel were fighting the fire complex.

The fire threatened millions of honeybees at Tugwell Creek Honey Farm and Meadery. It was fully contained on July 9.

The Shovel Fire, started on July 27, burned at least , and was still active as of August 20. Thick smoke harmed efforts to contain the fire.

A human-caused fire at Nanaimo Lakes, discovered on July 1, reached 14.5 hectares by July 4.

A total of 2,115 wildfires burned  of land in 2018 as of November 9.

As of August 28, initial estimates put 2018 as the largest burn-area in a British Columbia wildfire season, surpassing the historic 2017 wildfire season (1,216,053 total hectares). The total land burned in 2018 represented about ~1.4% of the total area of the province.

Smoke 
Wildfires caused severe smoke to cover much of British Columbia. It has impacted tourism and cancelled flights.
The smoke spread across Canada and as far as Ireland. In Prince George, British Columbia smoke orange sky at 8:40 AM, and 9:10 AM turns into midnight from wildfires. Then 3 PM in Grande Prairie, Alberta thick layered smoke plume generated by the fire which turned day into night during the afternoon of that day at the location.

See also
 List of disasters in Canada
 List of fires in Canada
 List of fires in British Columbia
 List of wildfires

References

Wildfires in Canada
British Columbia
2018 disasters in Canada
Natural disasters in British Columbia